Alain may refer to:

People
 Alain (given name), common given name, including list of persons and fictional characters with the name
 Alain (surname)
 "Alain", a pseudonym for cartoonist Daniel Brustlein
 Alain, a standard author abbreviation used to indicate Henri Alain Liogier, also known as Brother Alain, as the author when citing a botanical name
 Émile Chartier (1868–1951), French philosopher and antimilitarist commonly known as Alain

Places
 Alain, Iran, a village in Tehran Province, Iran
 Al Ain, a city in Abu Dhabi, United Arab Emirates
 Al Ain International Airport in the United Arab Emirates
 Val-Alain, Quebec, village of 950 people in Quebec, Canada

Other uses
 1969 Alain (1935 CG), a Main-belt Asteroid discovered in 1935
 Alain (crab), a genus of crabs in the family Pinnotheridae
 Prix Alain-Grandbois or Alain Grandbois Prize is awarded each year to an author for a book of poetry
 Rosa 'Alain', popular red floribunda rose variety

See also
 Allain (disambiguation)
 Al Ain (disambiguation)